State Road 522 (NM 522) is a  state highway in far northern New Mexico. It was named the Senator Carlos R. Cisneros Memorial Highway, after the late Taos County Commissioner and state senator, in 2022.

Its southern terminus is in El Prado, NM, at U.S. Route 64 (US 64) and NM 150, at what is locally referred to as the “old blinking light” intersection, approximately four miles north of Taos. From there, the state road heads north through Arroyo Hondo and then Questa, where it has a junction with NM 38. It then continues north to Costilla before its northern terminus at the Colorado state line where the road becomes Colorado State Highway 159 (SH 159).

The highway, which is makes up a short portion of the Enchanted Circle Scenic Byway, loosely follows a portion of the Old Spanish National Historic Trail’s north branch. It also goes through an area within Carson National Forest between Arroyo Hondo and Questa.

Major intersections

See also

References

External links

522
Transportation in Taos County, New Mexico